William Erwin Willmore (either 1844 or 1845 – January 16, 1901) was an English-born American teacher and the founder of a colony. He founded of Willmore City in 1876, which was bought by Long Beach, California and became a neighborhood of that city. 

He was born in England, and moved to California in 1855. He was a manager of the California Immigrant Union, an organization founded in 1869 to promote the settlement of California. He intended to make a thriving farm community oceanside in Southern California, but his goals weren’t realized until after his death. He died a pauper. Willmore is buried at Long Beach Municipal Cemetery.

References 

1844 births
1901 deaths
People from Long Beach, California
English emigrants to the United States
California pioneers